The 2013 NC State Wolfpack football team represented North Carolina State University in the Atlantic Division of the Atlantic Coast Conference during the 2013 NCAA Division I FBS football season. They played their home games at Carter–Finley Stadium in Raleigh, North Carolina. It was their first season under head coach Dave Doeren. They finished the season 3–9 overall, and 0–8 in ACC play to finish in last place in the Atlantic Division.

Schedule

Coaching staff

Game summaries

Louisiana Tech

Richmond

Clemson

Central Michigan

@ Wake Forest

Syracuse

@ Florida State

North Carolina

@ Duke

@ Boston College

East Carolina

Maryland

References

NC State
NC State Wolfpack football seasons
NC State Wolfpack football